Armor Hero Atlas is a 2014 Chinese science fiction action film directed by Zheng Guowei, based on the television series Armor Hero. It was released on October 1 in China.

Plot

Cast
Xu Feng
Cao Xiyue
Kenny Zeng
Li Xinze
Zhu Jiaqi
Li Honglei
Long Nv
Yan Hongyu
Jia Yuting
Shen Bo
Wu Yonggan
Geng Yi
Hong Sheng Zhang

Reception

References

2014 science fiction action films
Beijing Enlight Pictures films
Chinese animated films
Tokusatsu films
Films based on television series
Chinese science fiction action films
2010s Japanese films